This article is a list of notable individuals who were born in and/or have lived in Emporia, Kansas.

Academia

 Frank A. Beach (1911–1988), ethologist
 Richard Grant Hiskey (1929–2016), chemist
 Vernon Lyman Kellogg (1867–1937), entomologist, evolutionary biologist
 Samuel Martin (1924–2009), linguist
 Carl Salser (1921–2006), author, businessman, educator
 Arthur Samuel (1901–1990), computer scientist

Arts and entertainment

Film, television, and theatre
 Harry Cheshire (1891–1968), actor
 R. Lee Ermey (1944–2018), former U.S. Marine drill instructor, television host, and actor
 Thelma Hill (1906–1938), silent-film comedian
 James Still (1959– ), playwright

Journalism
 William Allen White (1868–1944), author and newspaper editor
 William Lindsay White (1900–1973), author, newspaper editor, CBS war correspondent, Reader's Digest roving editor

Literature
 Jacob M. Appel (1973– ), novelist (Einstein's Beach House)
 Don Coldsmith (1926–2009), novelist
 Denise Low (1949– ), poet
 Keith Waldrop (1932– ), poet, translator

Music
 Marvin Ash (1914–1974), jazz pianist
 Roy Burns (1935– ), drummer
 Melora Creager (1966– ), cellist, singer-songwriter
 Kelley Hunt, blues pianist, singer-songwriter
 Cady Groves (1989–2020)
 Brian Leeds (1991–), electronic musician

Other visual arts
 Wendell Castle (1932– 2018), furniture artist
 Evan Lindquist (1936– ), artist, printmaker, Arkansas artist laureate
 Albert Murray (1906–1992), portrait painter
 Wilber Moore Stilwell (1908–1974), cartoonist, illustrator, painter

Business
 David Green (1941– ), founder of Hobby Lobby
 George Webb Slaughter (1811–1895), cattle breeder and drover, Baptist minister

Crime and law enforcement
 Mark Essex (1949–1973), mass murderer

Military
 William F. Cloud (1825–1905), U.S. Army Colonel
 Grant F. Timmerman (1919–1944), U.S. Marine Corps Sergeant, Medal of Honor recipient

Politics

National
 William Ripley Brown (1840–1916), U.S. Representative from Kansas
Rose Conway, personal secretary to President Harry S. Truman
 Chad Johnson (1967– ), attorney, political activist
 Elmer O. Leatherwood (1872–1929), U.S. Representative from Utah
 Preston B. Plumb (1837–1891), U.S. Senator from Kansas, co-founder of Emporia
 Edward Herbert Rees (1886–1969), U.S. Representative from Kansas

State
 Jim Barnett (1955– ), Kansas state legislator
 Samuel J. Crawford (1835–1913), 3rd Governor of Kansas
 Don Hill (1944– ), Kansas state legislator
 Jeff Longbine (1962– ), Kansas state legislator
 Peggy Mast (1948– ), Kansas state legislator
 Richard Proehl (1944– ), Kansas state legislator
 Roy Wilford Riegle (1896–1988), Kansas state legislator

Religion
 Warren Parrish (1803–1877), early Mormon leader, Baptist minister

Sports
 Clint Bowyer (1979– ), NASCAR driver
 Jim Everett (1963– ), quarterback
 Daniel Gallemore (1985– ), mixed martial artist
 J. L. Lewis (1960–2019), professional golfer
 John Lohmeyer (1951– ), defensive lineman
 Ray Pierce (1897–1963), baseball pitcher
 Paul Samson (1905–1982), U.S. Olympic swimmer, water polo player
 Dean Smith (1931–2015), former North Carolina basketball coach, member of College Basketball Hall of Fame

See also
 Lists of people from Kansas
 List of people from Lyon County, Kansas

References

Emporia, Kansas
Emporia